La Felguerina is one of ten parishes (administrative divisions) in Caso, a municipality within the province and autonomous community of Asturias, in northern Spain. 

The postal code is 33995.

Villages
 La Felguerina 
 Brañafría
 El Burgosu
 El Pandu
 El Vallín
 La Cabañona
 La Cuesta
 La Infiesta
 Peréu
 Ricao
 Valquemáu
 Zamploña

References

Parishes in Caso